The 2011 Victoria Curling Classic Invitational was held at the Archie Browning Sports Centre in Victoria, British Columbia from March 31 to April 3. There was a men's and women's draw. The men played a triple-knockout tournament to determine 8 quarterfinal spots, while the women played a round-robin tournament in two pools of four, and the top two teams of each pool advanced to the semifinals.

Men

Teams

Results

A Event

B Event

C Event

Playoffs

Women

Teams

Round Robin

Standings

Results

Playoffs

External links
WCT Men's Event Page
WCT Women's Event Page

Victoria Curling Classic Invitational
Victoria Curling Classic Invitational
Sports competitions in Victoria, British Columbia
Curling in British Columbia